Moira was an electoral district of the Legislative Assembly in the Australian colony of Victoria from 1877 to 1889. It was located in northern Victoria, bordering the Murray River.

Members

      # = by-election

References

Former electoral districts of Victoria (Australia)
1877 establishments in Australia
1889 disestablishments in Australia